IMAF may refer to:
 International Martial Arts Federation, a Japanese organization promoting Budō
 International Modern Arnis Federation, an organization for the promotion and administration of Modern Arnis
 Institut des mondes africains (IMAF) (fr), an interdisciplinary research unit of (i) the French National Center for Scientific Research, (ii) the French Research Institute for Development, (iii) Pantheon-Sorbonne University, (iv) Aix-Marseille University, (v) École pratique des hautes études, and (vi) the School for Advanced Studies in the Social Sciences